"Old Black Joe" is a parlor song by Stephen Foster (1826–1864). It was published by Firth, Pond & Co. of New York in 1860. Ken Emerson, author of the book Doo-Dah! (1998), indicates that Foster's fictional Joe was inspired by a servant in the home of Foster's father-in-law, Dr. McDowell of Pittsburgh. The song is not written in dialect.

Emerson believes that the song's "soft melancholy" and its "elusive undertone" (rather than anything musical), brings the song closest to the traditional African-American spiritual.

Harold Vincent Milligan describes the song as "one of the best of the Ethiopian [contemporary parlance for blackface minstrel songs] songs ... its mood is one of gentle melancholy, of sorrow without bitterness. There is a wistful tenderness in the music." Jim Kweskin covered the song on his 1971 album Jim Kweskin's America.

The song has sometimes been recorded as "Poor Old Joe", including by Paul Robeson who recorded it several times, for example in 1928 and 1930. Other notable recordings were by Bing Crosby (recorded June 16, 1941), Jerry Lee Lewis (1959) and Al Jolson (recorded July 13, 1950).

Lyrics

Adaptations
 Thomas Dixon, Jr.'s one-act play Old Black Joe was produced in New York in 1912.
 Roy Harris made a choral adaptation of the song: Old Black Joe, A Free Paraphrase for full chorus of mixed voices a capella (1938).
 In July 1926, Fleischer Studios released a short cartoon of the song in the Song Car-Tunes series, made in the DeForest Phonofilm sound-on-film process.
The first line of the Chorus lyrics is sung by Bugs Bunny in the 1953 Looney Tunes cartoon "Southern Fried Rabbit".
Jerry Lee Lewis version with Gene Lowery Singers released in 1960.
In a 1973 episode of the TV sitcom Maude the character of Walter Findlay repeatedly plays the song on an electric organ.
In a 2000 episode of the TV sitcom Strangers with Candy a student sings and plays acoustic guitar. Season 2, Episode 6, "Hit and Run".
In the 1991 Palme d'Or winner Barton Fink, the character of W. P. Mayhew drunkenly performs Fosters song.
In the 2021 TV series Them, this song is sung in the pilot episode by multiple characters, and again in the fifth episode.

References

External links
 Sheet music
 "Old Black Joe" search at the Library of Congress' National Jukebox
 "Old Black Joe" search at the Internet Archive
 "Old Black Joe" sung by Collins & Harlan at the Alexandria Digital Research Library

1860 songs
American songs
Parlor songs
Songs about old age
Songs written by Stephen Foster
Blackface minstrel songs